The 1st World Table Tennis Championships were held in London from December 6 to December 11, 1926.

The championships were originally held as the European Championships which was the same year that the International Table Tennis Federation was formed. It was retrospectively designated as the first World Championships.

Medalists

Team

Individual

References

External links
ITTF Museum

 
World Table Tennis Championships
World Table Tennis Championships
World Table Tennis Championships
Table tennis competitions in the United Kingdom
International sports competitions in London
World Table Tennis Championships